HD 169405 (HR 6894), is a suspected binary star system in the southern constellation Telescopium, about a degree to the north of Zeta Telescopii. It has an apparent magnitude of 5.44, making it faintly visible to the naked eye under ideal conditions.

The visible component has a spectral classification K0.5III which indicates that it is an evolved star between a K0 and K1 giant.

References

K-type giants
Telescopium (constellation)
Durchmusterung objects
169405
090414
6894